Bob Rush may refer to:

Bob Rush (American football) (born 1955), center for San Diego and Kansas City
Bob Rush (Australian footballer) (1880–1975), VFL footballer and administrator at Collingwood
Bob Rush (baseball) (1925–2011), Major League pitcher from 1948 to 1960
Bobby Rush (born 1946), politician from South Side Chicago
Bobby Rush (musician) (born 1940), American blues and R&B musician, composer and singer